This is a list of the members of the United States Fencing Hall of Fame. The Hall of Fame itself is on display at the Museum of American Fencing, in Shreveport, Louisiana.

1963–1978
Note:  The USFA Hall of Fame Committee was disbanded in 1978.  Individuals who are indicated as entered into the Hall of Fame before 1978 may have been entered in years other than those listed.  The USFA Hall of Fame Committee was reinstated in 1996.

1963

Norman Armitage
George Calnan
Julio Castello
Clovis Deladrier
Robert Grasson
Sherman Hall
Graeme Hammond
John Huffman
Joseph Levis
Helene Mayer
James Murray
Leo Nunes
William Scott O’Connor
Joseph Brooks Bloodgood Parker
John Sanford Saltus
Giorgio Santelli
Maria Cerra
 

1967
 
Hugo Castello
Lajos Csiszar
Miguel de Capriles
Irving DeKoff
Andre Deladrier
Maxwell Garret
James Montague
Stanley Sieja
  

Prior to 1974
 
Dean Cetrulo
José de Capriles
Michael DeCicco
Ralph Faulkner
Ralph Goldstein
Alvar Hermanson
Tracy Jaeckel
Edward Lucia
Charles Schmitter
 

1974

Albert Axelrod
James Castello
Dr. Samuel D’Ambola
Istvan Danosi
Dernell Every
Julia Jones
Norman Lewis
Ray Miller
Tibor Nyilas
Rene Pinchart
Nicholas Toth
Joseph Vince
George Worth
 

Prior to 1978

Harriet King
Maxine Mitchell
Janice York Romary

  

1978
 
John Allaire
Henry Breckenridge
Dr. Daniel Bukantz
John Dimond
Helena Mroczkowska Dow
Warren Dow
Csaba Elthes
Jack Keane
Nickolas Muray
Frank Righeimer
Thomas Sands
Joseph Smith
Harold Van Buskirk

1996–2000
Note:  The USFA Hall of Fame Committee was disbanded in 1978, and then was reinstated in 1996.

1996

Joseph Byrnes
Joseph Pechinsky
Peter Westbrook
 

1997

Michael Marx
Paul Pesthy
Eleanor Turney
  

1998
Irwin Bernstein
Nikki Franke
Albertson Van Zo Post

1999
 
Vincent Bradford
Marco La Tapette
Alex Orban
Aaron Van Wormer
 

2000

Uriah Jones
Jana Angelakis
Odon Niederkirchner

2001–2005
2001

Jean-Jacques Gillet
Donna Stone
Dr. Ruth White
Charles Bothner
Mrs. Stuyvesant Fish
Charles Tatham
Joanna de Tuscan
Allan Kwartler
Neil Lazar
 

2002

Caitlin Bilodeau
Michael D'Asaro
George Masin
 

2003

Lee Shelley
Denise O'Connor
Eugene Hamori
 

2004
 
Gay (Jacobsen) D'Asaro
Heizaburo Okawa
Steve Sobel
Herb Spector
 

2005

Nick Bravin
Ed Richards
Michael Lofton
Abe Cohen

2006–present
2006
 
Michel Alaux
Gustave Heiss
Mathilde Jagemann
Aladar Kogler
  

2007
 
August Anderson
Yves Auriol
Dan DeChaine
Nat Goodhartz
Dorothy Locke
Alfred Sauer
 

2008

Charles DeKay
Charles Koch
Ed Korfanty
Cathy McClellan
David Micahnik
Carla-Mae Richards
Regis Senac
  

2009
 
Arkady Burdan
Henry Harutunian
Sherry Posthumus
Gilbert Rosiere
Jose Velarde
  

2010

Hugh Alessandroni
Robert Blum
Fr Lawrence Calhoun
Joseph Elliott
Yuri Gelman
Ella Hattan "La Jaguarina"
Aldo Nadi
 

2011

Arthur St Clair Lyon
Tanya Adamovich
Delmar Calvert
Ann Marsh
Stacey Johnson
 

2012

Henri Uyttenhove 	
Al Morales
Ed Ballinger 	
Sharon Monplaisir
Carl Borack 	
Felicia Zimmermann
Skip Shurtz 	
 

2013

Larry Anastasi
Cliff Bayer
Hans Halberstadt
Buckie Leach
Leonardo Terrone
Iris Zimmermann
 

2014

Ivan Lee
Richard Oles
Erinn Smart
Keeth Smart
Edward Vebell
Vladimir Nazlymov
 

2015
 
Becca Ward
Simon Gershon
Marty Schneider
Robert Cottingham
Michel Sebastiani
 

2016
 
Emily Cross
Emily Jacobson
Sada Jacobson
Seth Kelsey
Ted Li
Les Stawicki
 

2017
 
Molly Sullivan
Greg Massialas
Cody Mattern
Emmanuil Kaidanov
Eric Sollee
George Kolombatovich
 

2018
 
Ann O'Donnell (Russell)
Soren Thompson
Ro Sobalvarro
George Breed
 

2019
 
Paul Apostol
Dan Kellner
Jon Normile
Rob Stull
Jerzy Grzymski
William Reith
Jeff Wolfe
 

2020
 
Akhi Spencer-El
Steve Mormando
Justin Tausig
Gerald Cetrulo
Tony Orsi

See also
Fencing
List of American foil fencers
List of American sabre fencers

Footnotes

External links
US Fencing Hall of Fame
 USFA Roll of Honor
 Museum of American Fencing
 https://www.usafencing.org/hall-of-fame 

Fencing in the United States
Sports hall of fame inductees